Snelland is a village and civil parish in the West Lindsey district of Lincolnshire, England. The civil parish includes the hamlet of Swinthorpe. The population at the 2011 census was included in the civil parish of Friesthorpe.

Snelland is listed in Domesday Book of 1086 as "Sneleslunt", with seven households.  The nearby deserted medieval village of Swinthorpe is listed as "Sonetorp", with three households. There is evidence that a Cistercian grange existed at Swinthorpe, attached to Kirkstead Abbey.

The parish church is a Grade II listed building built of limestone and dedicated to All Saints. Dating from the 13th and 14th centuries, it was restored and largely rebuilt in 1863 by Edward Browning of Stamford.

Snelland railway station opened in the village in 1848, and closed in 1965.

References

External links

Villages in Lincolnshire
Civil parishes in Lincolnshire
West Lindsey District